Auguste Desgodins (16 October 1826, in Manheulles – 14 March 1913, in Pedong) was a French missionary who attempted to enter into Tibet in the early 1860s.  While both Desgodins and his colleague, the Vicar Apostolic Thomine-Desmazures were granted passports to enter Lhasa, Tibet in 1861 and 1862, they were repelled from the border on multiple occasions. He lived sometime in 
Darjeeling.

Desgodins published an essay of Tibetan grammar and was a key architect of the development of Tibetan-Latin dictionary French, which was published in 1899.

Along with Felix Biet, he founded in 1865 the Catholic Church of Yerkalo. Auguste Desgodins collected butterflies for Charles Oberthur.

References 

Oberthür, C. 1916 Lepidopterists Études de lépidoptérologie comparée, impr. Oberthür 11

Bibliography 
 Essai de grammaire Thibétaine: pour le langage parlé avec alphabet et prononciation, Imprimerie de Nazareth, 1899
  Dictionnaire Thibétain-Latin-Français: par les missionnaires catholiques du Thibet, Imprimerie de la Société des missions étrangères, 1899
 La mission du Thibet de 1855 à 1870, d'après les lettres de l'abbé Desgodins, Charles H. Desgodins, 1872
 Mémoires, Société académique indo-chinoise (Paris, France), A. Lorgeau, A. Biet, C. E. Bouillevaux, A. de Villemereuil, Eugène Aristide Marre, Léon Feer, G. H. J. Meyners d'Estrey (comte), Auguste Desgodins, L. M. J. Delaporte, J. Depuis, éditeur : Challamel ainé, 1879

Tibetologists
French Roman Catholic missionaries
People from Meuse (department)
1826 births
1913 deaths
French lexicographers
French male non-fiction writers
French entomologists
Roman Catholic missionaries in India
French expatriates in India
Missionary linguists